Norma Stoker (26 March 1905 – 21 August 1962) was an Irish tennis and badminton player.

Career 
Norma Stoker was successful in both tennis and badminton. In tennis, she lost in the singles final of the Irish Open in 1931 and 1933. In badminton, she won the national singles titles from 1934 to 1937 and the women's doubles in 1937 and 1938 at the Irish Open.

Family 
Norma Stoker was born on 26 March 1905, the daughter of the Wimbledon champion tennis player and rugby international Frank Stoker. The writer Bram Stoker is a distant relative of hers. She is buried at Glasnevin Cemetery in Dublin.

References

External links 
 http://www.bramstokerestate.com/Extended-Family-Bram-Stoker-Dacre-AE2-FO-Stoker-Graves-Stoker-Submarine-Wimbleton.html

Irish female badminton players
Irish female tennis players
People from County Dublin
1905 births
1962 deaths